Autoba costimacula is a species of moth of the family Erebidae first described by Max Saalmüller in 1880. It is found in southern and eastern Africa, on the islands of the Indian Ocean and in Yemen.

The wingspan of the adult moths is 14 mm.

Its larvae have been observed as predators of Coccoidea (scale insects).

Subspecies
Autoba costimacula costimacula (Saalmüller, 1880) - known from Yemen, South Africa, Uganda, Madagascar, Aldabra and Assumption Island (Seychelles).
Autoba costimacula mascarensis  Viette, 1975 - known from Réunion and Mauritius.

References

External links
 Flickr: picture of Autoba costimacula mascarensis

Boletobiinae
Moths described in 1880
Moths of Madagascar
Lepidoptera of Uganda
Moths of Mauritius
Moths of Seychelles
Moths of Réunion
Moths of Sub-Saharan Africa
Insects of the Arabian Peninsula